Austrosaga is a genus of insect in family Tettigoniidae. It contains the following species:
 Austrosaga spinifer

References 

Tettigoniidae genera
Taxonomy articles created by Polbot
Monotypic Orthoptera genera